Sarcocheilichthys variegatus is a small species of cyprinid freshwater fish that is endemic to Japan.

References

Sarcocheilichthys
Taxa named by Coenraad Jacob Temminck
Taxa named by Hermann Schlegel
Fish described in 1846